Damith Priyadharshana (born 13 April 1993) is a Sri Lankan cricketer. He made his first-class debut for Chilaw Marians Cricket Club in the 2012–13 Premier Trophy on 1 February 2013.

See also
 List of Chilaw Marians Cricket Club players

References

External links
 

1993 births
Living people
Sri Lankan cricketers
Chilaw Marians Cricket Club cricketers
Place of birth missing (living people)